CBMS may refer to:
 Conference Board of the Mathematical Sciences
 Chemical Biological Mass Spectrometer
 Comic Book Movies